Snorre Bjartmann Bjerck (born 25 February 1962) is a Norwegian jazz musician (drums, percussion and vocals). He has played in bands like "First Set", Jon Balke, Batagraf, and the sami band Transjoik., and is otherwise known from recordings and performances with others like: Morten Harket, Sissel Kyrkjebø, Mari Boine, Nils Petter Molvær, Bjørn Eidsvåg, Sigvart Dagsland, Frode Alnæs, Eivind Aarset, Annbjørg Lien, Arve Henriksen, Nils-Olav Johansen, Tim Whelan Trans Global Underground, Karoline Krüger among others.

Career 
Bjerck was born in Florø. He was a student on the Jazz program at Trondheim Musikkonservatorium [2]Musikkonservatorium[2]Musikkonservatorium (1984–86). He performs in the band Transjoik, Batagraf with Jon Balke, Helge Norbakken, Ingar Zach, and in his own musical projects. His uses percussion instruments from around the world, along with distinctive vocals and electronic sounds.

He made his solo recording debut with the album My Place (2006), and is influenced by traditional folk music and different environments, using unique samples collected during his tours in Europa, America, Asia and Afrika. These are used as mood elements in the production of a totally new format. Bjerck is often accompanied by guest musicians like the Sami joiker Ingor Ánte Áilo Gaup, and the Swiss bassist Mich Gerber. The production is his own assisted by Transjoik colleague Frode Fjellheim.

Honors 
Vossajazzprisen 2007.

Discography (in selection)

Solo works 
2006: My place (Vuelie)

Collaborative works 
Within Transjoik
1994: "JazzJoik Ensemble: Saajve Dans" (Idut)
1997: "Mahkalahke" (Warner Bros.)
2000: "Meavraa" (Warner Bros.)
2003: "Remix Project EP" (Vuelie)
2004: Uja Nami (Vuelie)
2005: Bewafá (Vuelie)

With others
1996: Letters (Turn Left), with Håvard Lund
1997: Ruošša Eanan (Atrium), with Ulla Pirttijärvi
1997: Ruošša Eanan (Turn Left), with Ulla Pirttijärvi
2003: Vind (Heilo), with Hans Fredrik Jacobsen
2008: Áibbaseapmi, with Ulla Pirttijärvi
2008: Taus, with Sigrid Moldestad
2010: Meelodi, Ole Andre Farstad
2011: December Song, Carsten Dyngeland Trio
2015: As I Walk, Anne Vada
2015: Spes, Cantus
2015: Barúos, Catarina Barruk
2015: Whatever Happens, Nils Are Drønen
2016: Tron Jensen
2016: Anodyne, Batagraf/Trondheim Voices
2016: Early Spring, Marja Mortenson Fjellheim

References

Videos
Batagraf https://vimeo.com/155655708
Batagraf https://vimeo.com/40399398
Batagraf https://vimeo.com/40396079

1962 births
Living people
People from Sogn og Fjordane
20th-century Norwegian drummers
21st-century Norwegian drummers
Norwegian jazz drummers
Male drummers
Norwegian jazz composers
Norwegian University of Science and Technology alumni
20th-century drummers
Male jazz composers
20th-century Norwegian male musicians
21st-century Norwegian male musicians